Van Zuylen van Nijevelt  ( is a noble family from the region of Rotterdam, town and region where several members of the family played a significant role. The head of the family is the Count van Zuylen van Nijevelt; the rest of the family bears the title baron or baroness.
This family must not be confused with the old noble family from Utrecht, Van Zuylen van Nievelt

Origins
During the 19th century members of this family tried to prove that they were descendants of the Utrecht noble family. This has later been found impossible to prove.
 
Their genealogy starts with a merchant in hosiery trade Van Zuylen. Later they added 'Van Nijevelt' at the time when they had become affluent and accomplished important duties in Rotterdam. In 1848 they added "Van De Weyer", because of a familial marriage.

Philip Julius van Zuylen van Nijevelt, senator, was made comte de l'Empire dd. 17 maart 1811. Several of his brothers were made baron de l'Empire in 1813 (not formally confirmed).

Under the United Kingdom of the Netherlands, several royal decrees, between 1815–1822, confirmed the noble status of the family. In 1822 the chief of the family was made a count and all other members baron and baroness.

Personalities
 mr. Jacob van Zuylen van Nijevelt (1699-1753), married in 1732 Aletta Johanna Timmers (1707-1775)
 mr. Jacob van Zuylen van Nijevelt (1739-1805), administrator of Rotterdam 1766-1805
 Jan Adriaan van Zuylen van Nijevelt (1776-1840), province governor.
 Arnout van Zuylen van Nijevelt (1780-1835), member of the reunion of notable citizens
 Jacob Pieter Pompejus van Zuylen van Nijevelt (1816-1890), prime minister
 Hugo van Zuylen van Nijevelt (1781-1853), minister.
 Philip Julius van Zuylen van Nijevelt (1743-1826), gouvernor of Amsterdam.
 Pieter Hendrik van Zuylen van Nijevelt (1782-1825), commander of Limburg
 Julius van Zuylen van Nijevelt (1819-1894), prime minister
 Robert van Zuylen van Nijevelt (1859-1911), mayor of Wassenaar.
 Philip Jules graaf van Zuylen van Nijevelt (1898-1940)
 Marie-Hélène van Zuylen van Nijevelt (1927-1996) French socialite 
 Count Hugo Robert Johan van Zuylen van Nijevelt (1929-2018), founder of Duinrell
 Philip van Zuylen van Nijevelt (1962), CEO Duinrell
 Roderick van Zuylen van Nijevelt (1964), CEO Duinrell.

Arms
The family has canting arms: zuil is the Dutch word for column. Hence, the coat of arm depicts three columns. It seems to have been copied from the arms of the van Zuylen van Nievelt family from Utrecht.

Literature
 H. Obreen-La maison de Zuylen dans l'histoire des Pays-Bas, (Tongerloo, 1933).
 D.G. van Epen-Het geslacht van Zuylen van Nijevelt, ('s-Gravenhage, 1904).

Dutch noble families
Dutch patrician families
Barons of the Netherlands